Hypsopygia almanalis is a species of snout moth in the genus Hypsopygia. It was described by Rebel in 1917, and is known from Cyprus and Turkey.

The wingspan is 19–20 mm.

References

Moths described in 1917
Pyralini